Audrey Marie Anderson (born March 7, 1975) is an American actress and model. She is best known for her role as Kim Brown in the CBS action-drama series The Unit (2006–2009) and her recurring roles as DC character Lyla Michaels / Harbinger in the Arrowverse, primarily Arrow (2013-2020), and Lilly in The Walking Dead (2013).

Career
In the early 1990s, Anderson began a modeling career, being featured in advertisements for brands such as Armani, Gap, Biotherm, Target and American Eagle Outfitters over the course of it, before having a recurring role in ABC drama series Once and Again. She attended and graduated from Barbizon Modeling and Acting School in Ft. Worth, Texas.

She is best known for portraying Kim Brown on the CBS series The Unit (2006–2009). She also appeared in the series Still Life and Going to California and was a guest star on Without a Trace. Her film credits include Drop Dead Sexy, Moonlight Mile, and Least Among Saints. She has also guest starred on NCIS: Los Angeles, Private Practice, and House. 

In 2013, she began recurring on Arrow as Lyla Michaels, the wife of John Diggle. In the show's final season, the character officially became Harbinger in time for the “Crisis on Infinite Earths” event.  Also in 2013, she began recurring on The Walking Dead as Lilly.

In 2022, she was a part of The Winchesters season 1 episode 6.

Filmography

Film

Television

References

External links 
 
 
 

1975 births
Living people
Actresses from Texas
Female models from Texas
American television actresses
American film actresses
21st-century American actresses
20th-century American actresses